Isaack Gilsemans (ca. 1606, in Rotterdam – 1646, in Batavia, Dutch East Indies), was a Dutch merchant and artist.

Biography
Gilsemans is most noted for joining the explorer Abel Tasman on his expedition in 1642-43 during which Tasmania, New Zealand and several Pacific Islands became known to Europeans. Gilsemans produced a number of drawings that documented island and native life. His depictions of the Māori people were the first for Europeans.

A sketcher and cartographer, he is thought to have been responsible for the coastal profiles in Tasman's journal and therefore the first European to make an image of Van Diemen's Land. Gilsemans' chart is responsible for documenting the first European landing in Tasmania in 1642, as a result of which Gilsemans Bay near Dunalley is named after him.

References

External links
 "The Merchant of the Zeehaen: Isaac Gilsemans and the Voyages of Abel Tasman" by Grahame Anderson
 "Some New Aspects of Tasman's Visit to the East Coast of Tasmania in 1642" by A. L. Meston

1600s births
1646 deaths
Dutch Golden Age painters
Dutch male painters
Painters from Rotterdam
Dutch merchants
Explorers of Tasmania
Maritime history of the Dutch East India Company
European exploration of Australia